Christoffer Sundqvist (born 1978) is a Finnish clarinettist. Since 2005 he has been first clarinet of the Finnish Radio Symphony Orchestra.

In 2013 he was the soloist in the first performance of the clarinet concerto Peregrinus ecstaticus by Erkki-Sven Tüür, with the Finnish Radio Symphony Orchestra under Hannu Lintu.

Prizes

 1998 Pro Musica medal
 2002 Shared first prize in the Crusell Clarinet Competition
 2011 Emma Award, CD of music by Jukka Tiensuu Alba ABCD 287
 2011 Emma Award, CD of music by Sebastian Fagerlund BIS SACD-1707

Discography
 2013 ‒ Nordgren: Concerto for Clarinet, Folk Instruments and Small Orchestra op. 14. Finnish Radio Symphony Orchestra, cond. Juha Kangas, Alba ABCD 359.
 2011 – Sebastian Fagerlund: Concerto for Clarinet and Orchestra. Gothenburg Symphony Orchestra, cond. Dima Slobodeniouk, BIS-SACD-1707.
 2011 ‒ Levitation. Peter Eötvös: Levitation; Carl Nielsen: Clarinet Concerto; Aulis Sallinen: Concerto for Clarinet, Viola and Chamber Orchestra op. 9. Finnish Radio Symphony Orchestra, cond. Hannu Lintu and Okko Kamu, Christoffer Sundqvist (clarinet), Kullervo Kojo (clarinet), Tommi Aalto (viola), Alba ABCD 314.
 2010 ‒ Jukka Tiensuu: Tango lunaire, Plus IV, Beat, Rubato, Asteletsa and Tombeau de Beethoven. Plus Ensemble (Erkki Lahesmaa, cello, Mikko Luoma, accordion and Christoffer Sundqvist, clarinet), Alba ABCD 287.
 2010 ‒ Atso Almila: Wind Quintet II Arctic Hysteria; Pehr Henrik Nordgren: Laupias samarialainen for Wind Quintet op. 141, Wind Quintet No. 2 op. 22; Joonas Kokkonen: Quintet for Flute, Oboe, Clarinet, Horn and Bassoon. Arctic Hysteria Wind Quintet (Matti Närhinsalo, flute, Anni Haapaniemi, oboe, Christoffer Sundqvist, clarinet, Tommi Hyytinen, horn and Ann-Louise Wägar, bassoon), Alba ABCD 307.
 2000 ‒ Sebastian Fagerlund: Emanations, for Solo Clarinet, Two Percussionists and String Orchestra. Turku Conservatory Orchestra, cond. Sauli Huhtala, KACD2001-2.

References

Further reading
 
 
 
 
 

Finnish clarinetists
1978 births
Living people
21st-century clarinetists